Ángel Parra (born 19 August 1983) is a Spanish judoka.

Achievements

References

1983 births
Living people
Spanish male judoka
Mediterranean Games bronze medalists for Spain
Competitors at the 2009 Mediterranean Games
Mediterranean Games medalists in judo
21st-century Spanish people